Trinity School is a private  preschool and elementary school located in Menlo Park in the Episcopal tradition  with about 150 students.

History
Trinity School was originally formed as Trinity Parish School in 1961 for children of the congregation. In 1978, there was a split within the school and the Phillips Brooks School was created.

References

External links

Private elementary schools in California
Menlo Park, California